Abraxas intervacuata is a species of moth belonging to the family Geometridae. It was described by Warren in 1896. It is known from Borneo, Java and Sulawesi.

References

Abraxini
Moths of Asia
Moths described in 1896